Wallington Cobblestone Schoolhouse District No. 8 is a historic one room school located at Sodus in Wayne County, New York.  The Federal style, cobblestone building is a one-story, three bay, center hall gable roofed structure with a louvered, gable roofed bell tower.

It was built about 1834 and is constructed of irregularly shaped, multi-colored, field cobbles. It ceased to function as a school in 1950 and is now a local historical museum used for school groups. The structure is among the approximately 170 surviving cobblestone buildings in Wayne County.

It was listed on the National Register of Historic Places in 1994.

Gallery

References

External links

Town of Sodus: Museums
 Wayne County Life: Wallington Cobblestone Schoolhouse

One-room schoolhouses in New York (state)
Schoolhouses in the United States
School buildings on the National Register of Historic Places in New York (state)
Federal architecture in New York (state)
Cobblestone architecture
School buildings completed in 1834
History museums in New York (state)
Museums in Wayne County, New York
Education museums in the United States
National Register of Historic Places in Wayne County, New York